The Quiet Ones, also known as Hush, is a 2010 American independent horror film directed by Amel J. Figueroa.

The film stars Courtney Gains, Reggie Bannister, Bill Allen, Adam C. Edwards and others.

References

External links
 

2010 films
2010 horror films
2010s English-language films